Oleksiy Korol (born 14 October 1977) is a Ukrainian soccer forward and coach who has spent most of his career in the United States.

Player
Born in Kyiv, Korol played both hockey and soccer growing up in Ukraine. As a youth player, he signed with Dynamo Kyiv. His family sent him to the United States when he was 14 where he settled in Livonia, New York. While playing for Livonia Central High School Korol scored 132 goals, the all-time record for a player in Section V (greater Rochester area) of the New York State Public High School Athletic Association. Later on, his record was tied by Jordan Chirico of Livonia Central High. Korol lived with the Chirico family in Livonia.

College
In 1996, he enrolled at Indiana University. While at Indiana, he spent four seasons on the men's soccer team. He scored 57 goals and assisted on 35 during his career with the Hoosiers. In 1998 and 1999, he was part of the Indiana teams which took the NCAA championship titles. Both years he led the tournament in scoring (6 goals in 1998 and 4 in 1999). In 1999, Korol as selected as a first team All American and the SoccerAmerica Player of the Year. While with Indiana, Korol spent the 1997 collegiate off season with the Kalamazoo Kingdom of the USL Premier Development League.

Professional
The Dallas Burn of Major League Soccer selected Korol with the fifth pick in the 2000 MLS SuperDraft. In his first year with the Burn, he scored five goals and assisted on three others. While with Dallas, he appeared in one game with the Atlanta Silverbacks.

On 15 January 2002, the Chicago Fire acquired Korol and Miguel Saavedra from the Burn for the Fire's 2002 sixth-round draft pick. However, injuries to his left knee which resulted in bursitis led to his playing in only one game. When the Fire waived him, Korol signed with the Rochester Raging Rhinos on 26 July 2002. He appeared in two games with them before moving to the Indiana Blast for one game. In 2003, he moved to the Pittsburgh Riverhounds of USL-2.  On 19 September 2003, the Kansas City Comets of Major Indoor Soccer League signed Korol to a one-year contract, with an option for one more. Korol played in nine games for the Comets as he was again hampered with injuries. The Comets waived him on 27 January 2004. On 12 February 2004, Korol signed with the Charleston Battery of USL-1. In June, the Battery released Korol and he signed with the Harrisburg City Islanders of USL-2 on 12 July 2004, in time for the playoffs.

The Rockford Thunder of the American Indoor Soccer League signed Korol in January 2007 and he spent the 2006–2007 AISL season with the Thunder.

Coach
In April 2006, Korol became an assistant coach at the University of Illinois at Chicago. Korol has also coached youth soccer with Chicago Lakefront SC.

In February 2009, Korol was named an assistant coach at his alma mater. His hiring came less than two months after former assistant coach Todd Yeagley left Indiana University to take over head coaching duties at the University of Wisconsin.
2010 Korol returned to UIC as the first assistant. He currently holds this position.

References

External links
 Charleston Battery bio
 Picture of Korol (in red)

1977 births
Living people
Footballers from Kyiv
Ukrainian SSR emigrants to the United States
Indiana Hoosiers men's soccer players
FC Dallas players
Atlanta Silverbacks players
Chicago Fire FC players
Indoor soccer players
Kalamazoo Kingdom players
A-League (1995–2004) players
Indiana Blast players
Pittsburgh Riverhounds SC players
Rochester New York FC players
Charleston Battery players
Penn FC players
American Indoor Soccer League players
Rockford Thunder (soccer) players
Kansas City Comets (2001–2005 MISL) players
USL Second Division players
Major League Soccer players
USL League Two players
FC Dallas draft picks
All-American men's college soccer players
Association football forwards
Ukrainian footballers
Indiana Hoosiers men's soccer coaches
UIC Flames men's soccer coaches
American soccer coaches
NCAA Division I Men's Soccer Tournament Most Outstanding Player winners